The Chikara Grand Championship was a professional wrestling championship owned by the Chikara promotion. The first champion was crowned on November 13, 2011, at the High Noon pay-per-view, when Eddie Kingston defeated Mike Quackenbush at the conclusion of a six-month long, twelve-person tournament.

Like most professional wrestling championships, the title is won via the result of a scripted match. Since the founding of the promotion in 2002 and before the Chikara Grand Championship was created, Chikara promoted only the Chikara Campeonatos de Parejas, a tag team championship, and the Chikara Young Lions Cup, a championship for rookies, but did not have a major singles championship until an announcement regarding the creation of the Grand Championship was made in February 2011. On March 14, 2013, Chikara announced that in the future the title would be defended at every event held by the promotion. This was later negated following Mike Quackenbush's takeover as Director of Fun and on August 1, 2014, he  announced a three-point system to determine contendership for the title, similar to the system used for the Campeonatos de Parejas. Under the system, wrestlers need to accumulate three back-to-back wins in order to be eligible to challenge for the title.

Overall, there have been nine reigns shared among eight wrestlers. One female wrestler, Princess KimberLee, has held the title. With the win, KimberLee became the first female wrestler to hold the top title in a major non-female promotion.

History

12 Large: Summit
On February 3, 2011, Chikara's new Director of Fun Wink Vavasseur announced that the promotion would be determining their first ever singles champion, nine years after the promotion was founded in 2002. Being new in his job, Vavasseur asked the Chikara roster to cast their vote on who should get to compete for the title with the only provision being that a wrestler cannot vote for themselves. For the next two months wrestlers such as Vin Gerard, UltraMantis Black, Green Ant, Brodie Lee and Icarus pleaded for votes on Chikara's official website. While most of Chikara's top rudo (villainous) stable Bruderschaft des Kreuzes (BDK) seemed united behind their leader Claudio Castagnoli, who had ordered his stablemates to vote for him, BDK member Sara Del Rey also asked for votes for herself.

 
On April 21, Vavasseur announced the result of the vote. Castagnoli had received the most votes, getting five votes from his seven stablemates. The others qualified were Jigsaw with three votes and Amasis, Brodie Lee, Eddie Kingston, Fire Ant, Hallowicked, Icarus, Mike Quackenbush, Sara Del Rey, UltraMantis Black and Vin Gerard, all with two votes. Vavasseur then revealed that the twelve wrestlers would then be divided into two blocks in a round-robin tournament, starting on May 21. On April 11, Chikara Wrestle Factory graduate and former Chikara Young Lions Cup Champion Larry Sweeney committed suicide. On April 29, Chikara announced that the tournament to determine the promotion's first ever singles champion would be named 12 Large: Summit, after Sweeney's catchphrase and finishing maneuver. On May 10, Chikara revealed the tournament's block structure and rules; each match in the tournament had a 60 minute time limit, a win was worth two points and a draw one point. The top wrestler from each block would then face each other on November 13 to determine the first ever Chikara singles champion.

On May 16, Vavasseur announced that Amasis had suffered an injury, which would force him out of the tournament. He then gave Chikara's fans the right to vote one of his Osirian Portal stablemates, Hieracon or Ophidian, to take his place. On June 18, Vavasseur announced that Ophidian had won the vote and would get the vacant spot in the tournament. Meanwhile, also Brodie Lee was sidelined with an injury and was forced to pull out of his match with Eddie Kingston on June 26, giving Kingston two points via forfeit. Lee was, however, given the opportunity to rejoin the tournament later, but never did make his return, forfeiting the rest of his matches. Jigsaw started the tournament on the sidelines, but returned at the July 30 event. On July 25, Ophidian announced that he had broken his jaw and would be forced to forfeit his match with Icarus on July 31. On August 27, Claudio Castagnoli became the first person eliminated from contention in the tournament, after being defeated by Icarus. Following the event, Castagnoli signed a contract with WWE and was forced to forfeit his final match against Ophidian. On August 1, Chikara announced that the finals on November 13 would take place on the promotion's first ever live internet pay-per-view High Noon. When the event's poster was revealed on August 29, the championship's name was at the same time revealed as the Chikara Grand Championship. On October 7, Mike Quackenbush secured the top spot in Block A with a win over Sara Del Rey. The following day, Eddie Kingston won Block B, when Jigsaw defeated the only man who could have threatened his number one spot, UltraMantis Black. On November 13 at High Noon, Kingston defeated Quackenbush to win the 12 Large: Summit and become the inaugural Chikara Grand Champion.

Reigns

Combined reigns

See also
Chikara Campeonatos de Parejas
Chikara Young Lions Cup

References

External links
Title history at Wrestling-Titles.com

Chikara (professional wrestling) championships